Bouna (also spelled Buna) is a town in north-eastern Ivory Coast. It is a sub-prefecture of and the seat of Bouna Department. It is also the seat of Bounkani Region in Zanzan District and a commune.

Near Bouna is the Comoé National Park and the Ghanaian border. The main town of the Lobi people, Bouna is known for the vernacular architecture of the fortress-style adobe compounds in surrounding villages. Bouna is historically a Koulango village.

Bouna was formerly the centre of a "highly centralized kingdom based on military districts administered by princes" who exploited the local gold deposits; the kingdom was created in the late-17th century by Bounkani, an immigrant from the Dagomba people. Like Kong, it became a major center of Islamic learning.  In fact the imam of Bighu resettled here after the collapse of that city.

The town is served by its own dirt-runway airport. This bush landing strip mainly serves the United Nations.

Bouna was one of the main strongholds of the Nouvelle Forces, the rebel army of the 2002 attempted coup d'état. The general population of Bouna suffered greatly in the early days of the rebellion. Things are gradually returning to normal in the area. However, there is much to be done to get the region fully functional in the areas of education and health.

In 2021, the population of the sub-prefecture of Bouna was 94,883.

Villages
The one hundred and twenty four villages of the sub-prefecture of Bouna and their population in 2014 are:

Notes 

Sub-prefectures of Bounkani
Communes of Bounkani
Regional capitals of Ivory Coast